Desley Carole Boyle (born 29 March 1948) is a former Labor politician. Boyle represented the electoral district of Cairns, Queensland in the Legislative Assembly of Queensland and was elected in the 1998 State election and served until 2012

Early life and career
Boyle was the director and clinical psychologist for Desley Boyle and Associates, in Cairns. She held a position with the Cairns' local government from 1988 to 1994, including two years as Deputy Mayor.

Member of parliament
She served on the Parliamentary Crime and Misconduct Committee between 2002 and 2004.

Beattie Ministry
Boyle held various positions in the Beattie Ministry. She was appointed Minister for Local Government and Planning in February 2004, and added the new post of Minister for Women a month later. In August 2004, she also added Minister for Minister for the Environment. In a September 2006 reshuffle, she was appointed Minister for Child Safety.

Bligh Ministry
When Anna Bligh took over from Beattie in September 2007, Boyle was appointed Minister for Tourism, Regional Development and Industry. Following the 2009 election, she returned to the Local Government portfolio as Minister for Local Government and Aboriginal and Torres Strait Islander Partnerships.

On 17 February 2011, Boyle announced that she would be retiring at the 2012 state election and stood down from Cabinet four days later.

At the election, Labor lost the seat to Gavin King of the Liberal National Party.

Personal life
Desley lives in Cairns, Tropical North Queensland.  She has three children and three grandchildren.  Her hobbies include theater, film and contemporary music.

External links
 ABC's "2009 State Elections Results for Cairns" Accessed 22 March 2009

References

1948 births
Living people
Members of the Queensland Legislative Assembly
People from Cairns
Australian Labor Party members of the Parliament of Queensland
21st-century Australian politicians
21st-century Australian women politicians
Women members of the Queensland Legislative Assembly